Sidi Bashir Mosque is a former mosque in the city of Ahmedabad, Gujarat, India. Only the central gateway and two minarets survive; they are known as the Jhulta Minar or Shaking Minarets.

History

The mosque is believed to have been constructed either by Sidi Bashir, a slave of Sultan Ahmed Shah, or by Malik Sarang, a noble in the court of Mahmud Begada, another Sultan of Gujarat. It has been dated to 1452, although the style and material of the minarets point to the close of Mahmud Begada's reign (1511) or later. The body of the building was destroyed in 1753 during the war between the Marathas and the Mughal governor of Gujarat; only two minarets and the arched central gateway connecting them remain.

Minarets
The minarets are the tallest in Ahmedabad and are now located to the north of Ahmedabad Junction railway station. Though much damaged, especially near the foot, the stairs inside the minarets may still be used. The minarets are three stories tall with carved balconies. A gentle shaking of either minaret results in the other minaret vibrating after a few seconds,  though the connecting passage between them remains free of vibration. The mechanism of this is not known, although the layered construction is thought to be a factor. The phenomenon was first observed in the 19th century by Monier M. Williams, an English Sanskrit scholar. The minarets are able to withstand fast-moving trains passing close by.

Other shaking minarets
Another mosque in Ahmedabad called the Raj Bibi Mosque also had shaking minarets similar to those at the Sidi Bashir Mosque. Under the British Raj, one was dismantled in order to study the construction, but could not be put back together.

There is also one in Isfahan, Iran, called Monar Jonban (shaking minarets) with almost the same properties.

A further example is a large mosque built by Makhdu-Ma-I-Jahan, mother of Sultan Qutubuddin Ahmad Shah II in 1454 A.D. She is buried in the mausoleum situated to the east of the mosque.

Present condition
Entry to the shaking minaret was prohibited following an incident in 1981 at Qutb Minar in Delhi, when a stampede resulted in the deaths of many children. There is also damage to the upper sections.

References 

 This article includes public domain text from 

Religious buildings and structures completed in 1452
15th-century mosques
Mosques in Ahmedabad
Monuments of National Importance in Gujarat